Thomas Maskew Miller (1863 - 1926) was a South African bookseller and publisher. Miller founded his namesake press in 1893 as a family business after working for Darter Brothers & Walton. He opened offices in Cape Town, Pretoria, and Bulawayo. Initially, he imported books and stationery for sale, but later he began publishing books himself.

The offices in Pretoria and Bulawayo were only active from 1901 to 1914. In 1924, the firm established itself as a limited company, and the printer was named Maskew Miller Beperk. The two printers published 24 children's books in this era, although they focused mainly on school textbooks. They published children's poetry, fiction, and short stories along with a series known as Maskew Miller se Afrikaanse Leesboekies.

Maskew Miller's business merged with Longman in 1983 to form Maskew Miller Longman. Today Maskew Miller Longman belongs to Pearson Education, itself part of the conglomerate Pearson plc.

Publications 
 Maskew Miller's Miniature English Dictionary in the Simplified (Kollewijn) Dutch Spelling. English-Dutch and Dutch-English; 1909
 Maskew Miller's Twintig Stellen Proefopgaven Voor Het Hollands; Cape Town/Pretoria, 1912
 Maskew Millers Hollandse Taalboek voor standaards IV en V.; 1914
 My eerste Leesboekies; by H.J.M. Scheepers, 1919 (the first reader in Afrikaans)
 Maskew Miller se Korte Afrikaans-Engelse woordelysie; by H.J.M. Scheepers; 1922
 Sketse uit die Geskiedenis... Oorgesit in Afrikaans; by H.J.M. S(cheepers); 1922
 Maskew Miller se Afrikaanse Leesboekies; Saamgestel by Francis William Reitz (tweede en verbeterde uitgawe); Cape Town, 1923
 Maskew Miller se Meetkunde ... Vertaal; by J. Steph. V. D. Lingen; Cape Town, 1924
 Maskew Miller se korte geskiedenis van Suid-Afrika (met vele illustrasies) vir die gebruik in skole; by Thomas Young, George McCall Theal, and F.W. Reitz, Cape Town, 1926
 Maskew Miller's Pleasant Stories for Young Readers; 1929
 Maskew Miller se Handelsreeks; 1938
 Maskew Miller se Toetsoefeningkaarte in Rekenkunde; Cape Town, 1940
 Maskew Miller se Afrikaans sonder grense Eerste Addisionele Taal;
 The Mission that Failed!;1898
 Science in South Africa: A Handbook and Review prepared under the auspices of the South African Governments and the South African Association for the Advancement of Science; 1905
Miller’s New Map of British South Africa ; 1905
 Pre-historic Rhodesia; 1909
The Bulawayo Cookery Book; 1909

External links 
 Maskew Miller Longman homepage
The Rhodesian Study Circle

References 

South African businesspeople
1863 births
1926 deaths